Șirna is a commune in Prahova County, Muntenia, Romania. It is composed of six villages: Brătești, Coceana, Hăbud, Șirna, Tăriceni and Varnița.

References

Communes in Prahova County
Localities in Muntenia